Charles Cutler was an Australian politician.

Charles Cutler may also refer to:

Charles R. Cutler, engineer
Charles Cutler (wrestler) (1884–1952), American professional wrestler

See also